Helmut Seeger (born 7 October 1932) is a German former sports shooter. He competed in the 25 metre pistol event at the 1972 Summer Olympics for West Germany.

References

External links
 

1932 births
Living people
German male sport shooters
Olympic shooters of West Germany
Shooters at the 1972 Summer Olympics
Sportspeople from Offenbach am Main